Jiangbei railway station is a railway station of Changchun–Tumen Railway and Jilin–Shulan Railway. The station located in the Longtan District of Jilin, Jilin province, China.

See also
Changchun–Tumen Railway
Jilin–Shulan Railway

References

Railway stations in Jilin